Masada Anniversary Edition Volume 3: The Unknown Masada is the third album in a series of five releases celebrating the 10th anniversary of John Zorn's Masada songbook project. It features twelve previously unreleased Masada compositions performed by Erik Friedlander's Quake (1), Rashanim (2), Dave Douglas (3), Tatsuya Yoshida (4), Naftule's Dream (5), Jamie Saft (6), Zahava Seewald (7), Koby Israelite (8), Julian Kytasty (9); Fantômas (10), Wadada Leo Smith and Ikue Mori (11), and Eyvind Kang (12).

Reception
{{Album ratings
| rev1 = Allmusic
| rev1Score = <ref name="AM">{{cite web |first=Sean |last= Westergaard |title= The Unknown Masada''' > Review |url= |publisher=Allmusic |access-date=June 13, 2010}}</ref>
| rev2 = Pitchfork Media
| rev2Score =   
|rev3 = The Penguin Guide to Jazz Recordings|rev3score  = 
}}
Allmusic critic Sean Westergaard wrote "... there is a tremendous amount of stylistic diversity here, from the very traditional sound of Julian Kytasty to the very untraditional sounds of Fantômas. In fact, listeners more familiar with The Circle Maker or Bar Kokhba might not be prepared for some of the hard rock treatments of some of these tunes... The Zorn crowd tends to follow his every move and usually know what to expect; the uninitiated should probably approach this one with some caution."

Dominique Leone was positive about the disc as a whole, writing: "...for the most part Zorn's music has yet again proved to withstand the test of time and interpretation. If Masada does indeed go down as his greatest moment, it will be in part because other musicians have run with his ideas and been able to make their own artistic marks with his music. In that sense, The Unknown Masada'' and the other anniversary series albums are as significant as any release in his canon."

Track listing 

 "Kinyan" (arr. Erik Friedlander) – 4:50
 "Olamim" (arr. Rashanim) – 3:48
 "Vehuel" (arr. Dave Douglas) – 5:32
 "Shofetim" (arr. Yoshida Tatsuya) – 3:02
 "Partzuf" (arr. Michael McLaughlin) – 4:22
 "Zarach" (arr. Jamie Saft) – 6:57
 "Shagal" (arr. by Seewald, Grebil, Florizoone) – 6:46
 "Herem" (arr. Koby Israelite) – 5:06
 "Kadmut" (arr. by Julian Kytasty) – 4:44
 "Zemaraim" (arr. Trevor Dunn) – 3:34
 "Demai" (arr. by Smith, Mori) – 6:22
 "Belimah" (arr. Eyvind Kang) – 4:09

Personnel
Erik Friedlander (1) – cello, mandolin
Andy Laster (1) – saxophone, clarinet
Satoshi Takeishi (1) – percussion
Stomu Takeishi (1) – bass
Jon Madof (2) – guitar
Shanir Ezra Blumenkranz (2) – bass
Mathias Kunzli (2) – drums, percussion
Dave Douglas (3) – trumpet, Fender Rhodes
Greg Tardy (3) – tenor
John Zorn (3) – alto
Greg Cohen (3) – bass
Ben Perowsky (3) – drums
Yoshida Tatsuya (4) – all instruments, voice
Glenn Dickson (5) – clarinet
Gary Bohan (5) – trumpet
Brandon Seabrook (5) – guitar
Michael McLaughlin (5) – piano
Jim Gray (5) – tuba
Eric Rosenthal (5) – drums
Jamie Saft (6) – all instruments
Zahava Seewald (7) – vocals
Micjael Grebil (7) – oud, medieval fiddle, ceterina d'amore
Tuur Florizoone (7) – accordion
Solomon ibn Gabirol (7) – text
Koby Israelite (8) – drums, percussion, accordion, guitars, keys, clarinet, vocals
Yaron Stavi (8) – bass, guitar
Sid Gauld (8) – flugelhorn
John Telfer (8) – baritone saxophone
Julian Kytasty (9) – bandura
Mike Patton (10) – voice, electronics
Buzz Osborne (10) – guitar
Trevor Dunn (10) – bass
Dave Lombardo  (10) – drums
Wadada Leo Smith (11) – trumpet
Ikue Mori (11) – laptop electronics
Eyvind Kang (12) – all instruments

References

2003 albums
Albums produced by John Zorn
Tzadik Records albums
Masada Anniversary albums